Sylvius Leopold Weiss (12 October 168716 October 1750) was a German composer and lutenist.

Born in Grottkau near Breslau, the son of Johann Jacob Weiss, also a lutenist, he served at courts in Breslau, Rome, and Dresden, where he died. Until recently, he was thought to have been born in 1686, but recent evidence suggests that he was in fact born the following year.

Weiss was one of the most important and most prolific composers of lute music in history and one of the best-known and most technically accomplished lutenists of his day. He was a teacher to Philip Hyacinth, 4th Prince Lobkowicz, and the prince's second wife Anna Wilhelmina Althan.

In later life, Weiss became a friend of Wilhelm Friedemann Bach and met J.S. Bach through him. Bach and Weiss were said to have competed in improvisation, as the following account by Johann Friedrich Reichardt describes:

"Anyone who knows how difficult it is to play harmonic modulations and good counterpoint on the lute will be surprised and full of disbelief to hear from eyewitnesses that Weiss, the great lutenist, challenged J.S. Bach, the great harpsichordist and organist, at playing fantasies and fugues."

Sylvius Weiss's son Johann Adolph Faustinus Weiss succeeded him as a Saxon court lutenist. (Johann Adolf Hasse married to Faustina Bordoni were obviously close friends).

Works

Weiss probably wrote more than 1000 pieces for lute, from which about 850 attributed pieces survived, most of them grouped into 'sonatas' (not to be confused with the later classical sonata, based on sonata form) or suites, which consist mostly of baroque dance pieces. Weiss also wrote chamber pieces and concertos, but only the solo parts have survived for most of them.

External links

Classical Composers Database
Silvius Leopold Weiss

References

1687 births
1750 deaths
People from Grodków
People from Austrian Silesia
Composers for lute
German Baroque composers
18th-century classical composers
German lutenists
German male classical composers
18th-century German composers
18th-century German male musicians